The AEG C.IV was a German two-seat biplane reconnaissance aircraft that entered service in 1916.

Design and development
The C.IV was based on the AEG C.II, but featured a larger wingspan and an additional forward-firing Spandau-type 7.92 mm (.312 in) machine gun. In addition to reconnaissance duties, the C.IV was used as a bomber escort, despite proving itself inadequately powered for the role. Nevertheless, the C.IV was easily the most successful of AEG's World War I B- and C-type reconnaissance aircraft, with some 687 being built and the model remained in service right up to the end of the war.

A variant, the C.IV.N was designed specifically as a prototype night bomber in 1917, with the Benz Bz.III engine used in other C-types and a lengthened wingspan.  Another variant, the C.IVa, was powered by a 130 kW (180 hp) Argus As III engine.

C.IV aircraft saw service with the Bulgarian Air Force (1 machine) and the Turkish Flying Corps (46 machines).

A big number of 91 C.IVs were captured by the Polish in 1919, most in Poznań during Greater Poland Uprising. Most of them were next assembled and entered service. It became one of basic aircraft of the Polish Air Force, used for reconnaissance, bombing and strafing during Polish-Soviet War in 1919-1920. Most were withdrawn in 1921.

Operators

 Bulgarian Air Force
 Luftstreitkrafte
 Hejaz Air Force - single example, not airworthy
 Polish Air Force - up to 91 aircraft, used postwar
 Ottoman Air Force

Specifications (AEG C.IV)

See also

References

Bibliography

 Kroschel, Günter; Stützer, Helmut: Die deutschen Militärflugzeuge 1910-18, Wilhelmshaven 1977

 Nowarra, Heinz: Die Entwicklung der Flugzeuge 1914-18, München 1959
 Sharpe, Michael: Doppeldecker, Dreifachdecker & Wasserflugzeuge, Gondrom, Bindlach 2001, 

C.IV
Single-engined tractor aircraft
Biplanes
1910s German military reconnaissance aircraft
Aircraft first flown in 1916